Ren Zhengfei (born 25 October 1944) is a Chinese entrepreneur and engineer who is the founder and CEO of Huawei Technologies, the world's largest manufacturer of telecommunications equipment and second largest manufacturer of smartphones.

Early life
 On October 25, 1944,Ren Zhengfei was born in Zhenning County, Guizhou Province. He spent his primary and junior high school in the mountain village near his home.
In 1960, there was a serious famine in Guizhou Province. At this time, Ren Zhengfei's family was starving. In order to support his family, Ren Zhengfei implemented a strict system of food distribution in his family. In order to cope with hunger, Ren Zhengfei often went to the mountains to pick wild fruits instead of grain.

He always wore a single layer coat because of poverty in high school.In his third year of high school, no matter how hungry he was, he did not eat the rations of his family. Thanks to this, none of his brothers and sisters starved to death.In order to solve hunger, Ren Zhengfei mixed rice bran and vegetables together to eat, which he stopped when his father found out.With the Chinese gaokao approaching, Cheng Yuanzhao（程远昭） gave him a scallion pancake every morning even though he was poor. Ren Zhengfei later thought the pancake was crucial to his future achievements.
In 1963, 19-year-old Ren Zhengfei was admitted to Chongqing Institute of Architectural Engineering (later merged into Chongqing University) to major in HVAC.Cheng Yuanzhao made him two white shirts and a pair of sheets, which accompanied him through four years of college.
In 1966, when Mao Zedong launched the Cultural Revolution.Ren Zhengfei, who was studying in college, received a letter mentioning that his father had been overthrown and criticized for his experience working in the Kuomintang's 412 military factory.Ren Zhengfei boarded a train surrounded by Red Guards who were asking the passengers about their background. Because he replied that his father was a teacher, Ren Zhengfei was pushed off the train by them，so he had to walk home.

Ren Zhengfei told his family that there were also in "fights" in college, and basically no one took classes, but his father told him that knowledge was important and encouraged him to use it to help his brothers and sisters.

After returning to college, Ren Zhengfei taught himself computer, digital technology, automatic control, logic, philosophy and three foreign languages.Ren Zhengfei collected leaflets and sent them to his mother to encourage his father who was in trouble. In one piece of paper, there is a passage from Zhou Enlai（周恩来）: "cadres should seek truth from facts. If they are not, do not admit it at random. Things will always be figured out." Cheng Yuanzhao passed this passage on to his father. Because of this note, his father didn't suicide.

In 1970, he obeyed the policy of all college students leaving school to join the army for training.

Career History
In 1968, Ren Zhengfei graduated from university and was assigned to the 304th Battalion of the 31st Detachment of the Infrastructure Engineering Corps in Anshun, which was founded in 1966, to participate in the construction of the aircraft factory of the 011 base.
 In 1974, in order to build industrial modernization, he established Liaoyang Petrochemical Fiber General Factory in Liaoyang.In the same year, Ren Zhengfei was drafted into the army and joined the 22nd detachment of the Chinese people's Liberation Army Infrastructure Engineering Corps, which is responsible for the construction of this project. he has served as a technician and engineer, and is engaged in automatic control of the chemical industry.
From Oct.8 to Nov.5, 1977, infrastructure engineers held a working meeting in Beijing. As a young technician, Ren Zhengfei won an award at the meeting for his successful development of air pressure balance.
 In March 1978, 33-year-old Ren Zhengfei went to Beijing to attend the National Science Conference attended by more than 6000 delegates. The same year, Ren Zhengfei joined the Chinese Communist Party.
 In 1982, the government of the People's Republic of China readjusted its economic and military system and reduced army. Because Ren Zhengfei is the backbone of technology, the leader is going to transfer him to a scientific research base. At this time, Ren Zhengfei's wife is already one step ahead of him to work in Shenzhen Southern Oil Group(深圳市南油(集团)有限公司). Subsequently, he made a job transfer, ended 11 years of army life, and went south to Shenzhen with his sons and daughters. The same year, he attended the 12th National Congress of the Chinese Communist Party.After joining the Southern Oil Group, Ren Zhengfei could not stand the bureaucracy of some department leaders who were content with the status quo and did not want to make progress, and requested that one of the company's subsidiaries be handed over to him, but it was not approved.
 In 1983, he was appointed deputy general manager of an electronics company owned by the group. Soon after, Ren Zhengfei was cheated out of more than 2 million yuan by a businessman. at that time, his monthly salary in the mainland was less than 100 yuan. Ren Zhengfei's first job ended in resignation. After resigning, Ren Zhengfei divorced his wife, and he rented a house of more than ten square meters with his parents and nephews.

Huawei

Establishment and Start 
In 1987, Ren Zhengfei, 43, and his partners founded Shenzhen Huawei Technology Co., Ltd., which means "Connected to China, and making a difference"(心系中华，有所作为)".At the beginning of the establishment of the company, friends recommended him to make money as a tombstone with high profits, but Ren Zhengfei thought that the tombstone was not a long-term solution and gave up.

After the introduction of a friend, he began to sell industrial instruments, but due to the small order, it is not enough to maintain the normal operation of the company. Later, Ren Zhengfei earned the first money for the company by selling HAX program-controlled switches on consignment.At that time, the Chinese market was full of products from various countries. Faced with the gradual decline in switch prices and great competition, Ren Zhengfei made a decision to import components made in China and hire people to assemble small user exchanges.

He has been president of Huawei since 1988.
In September 1991, Ren Zhengfei assembled Huawei program-controlled switch with his employees.As Huawei's products are cheap, supply exceeds demand.Because of the shortage of domestic parts, Ren Zhengfei continued to assemble products while starting research and development.Like his employees, Ren Zhengfei eats and lives in the factory and makes soup for his employees in the evening.Due to the long time of research and development and the shortage of expenditure, Ren Zhengfei had to borrow usury to maintain the normal operation of the company.Soon, Ren Zhengfei promoted the new BH03 switch.In order to solve the sales problem, he began to accept agents.
In 1992, Ren Zhengfei invited professors and students from Huazhong Technology University(华中科技大学), Tsinghua University and other universities to visit and visit China.
In early 1993, more than 270 Huawei employees held a 1992 summary meeting in a small auditorium in Shekou, Shenzhen. Ren Zhengfei decided to use switches in the R & D Bureau to enter the field of public telephones and telecommunications.At the meeting, he presented 100 gold medals to outstanding employees and the boss of Hongnian Company（鸿年公司） in Hong Kong, which supported the start of the Huawei.Ren Zhengfei poached Xu Wenwei（徐文伟） from the nearby Yilida Group（亿利达集团） and put him in charge of the hardware.
In May 1993, Ren Zhengfei presided over a meeting of marketing managers and officially launched the JK1000 office telephone, after which more than 200 units were sold.In order to seek talents, Ren Zhengfei also set up a "Talent recommendation Award". JK1000 products focus on the use of analog circuit technology rather than digital circuit technology, so that Ren Zhengfei tasted the mistake of not keeping up with the pace of the times.At that time, the company was short of money, and Huawei's salary was half paid, and the other half was recorded in the account. Ren Zhengfei set up a "everyone shareholding system": converting half of his recorded wages into shares in Huawei, which can be exchanged for cash when he resigns.
In 1995, Ren Zhengfei invited many professors from People University of China（中国人民大学） to teach at Huawei.
In March 1996, Ren Zhengfei invited professors to form a Huawei basic Law drafting group.The Huawei basic Law was completed in 1998.

Acquisition of Harbor Network Company 
In 1998, due to the contradiction between Li Yinan（李一男） and Ren Ping and Zheng Baoyong（郑宝用）, Ren Zhengfei transferred him from the Central Research Department to take charge of the product department in charge of the market and served as the president of the marketing department.Ren Zhengfei sent the vice president to communicate with him many times without success, but held a grand farewell meeting for him.
In 2002, in the face of Harbor Network Company grabbing the market and poaching people, Ren Zhengfei ordered to withdraw the agency granted by Huawei to Harbor Network to sell Huawei products, and set up a "hit Hong Kong Office" to block Harbor Network Company.
In 2005, Ren Zhengfei dug up all the voice teams of the Harbor Shenzhen Research Institute to Huawei for 1 million.
On May 10, 2006, Ren Zhengfei met with Li Yinan at Huawei 3COM headquarters in Hangzhou.

Deal with Cisco
In January 2003, Cisco Systems hired an American lawyer to file a more than 70-page complaint against Huawei in Marshall Federal Court in Texas.Ren Zhengfei held a high-level meeting and finally decided that "Only by daring to fight can we make peace, and to lose a little is to win.（敢打才能和，小输就是赢）"

Expand overseas markets 
Ren Zhengfei aims at the international market in four steps: the first is the neighboring Hong Kong market, the second is Russia and South America, the third is Southeast Asia, the Middle East and Africa, and the fourth is developed countries.In order to enter the international market, Ren Zhengfei put forward the idea of "Huawei globalization": globalized management, globalized R & D, globalized talents, globalized sales and globalized corporate culture.

Since 1996, Ren Zhengfei has successively hired IBM and other American and British companies to reform Huawei's R & D, supply chain, financial and market system, implementing the same integrated product development system, integrated supply chain, human resource management, financial management and quality control as IBM.
In 1996, Ren Zhengfei led Huawei to compete in the international market, partnering with Li Ka-shing's Hutchison Telecom: Huawei provided it with commercial network products with narrowband switches as its core products.
In 1997, Ren Zhengfei sent a delegation to visit Russia. As early as three years ago, he aimed at the huge Russian market with economic difficulties and lack of industrial upgrading.On April 8, Ren Zhengfei went to Ufa,Russia, to attend the signing ceremony of "BertoHuawei", a joint venture company between Huawei and Russia.

Be Crowded Out 
Ren's possible ties with the PLA have been cited by the Indian government as a security concern in not allowing Huawei to win certain contracts in India. These fears are shared by other countries.

In the United States it led to the collapse of Huawei's efforts to buy 3Com and forced SoftBank to greatly sever ties with Huawei in order to have its takeover of Sprint Nextel acquire US national-security clearance, while in the United Kingdom the Intelligence and Security Committee has recommended the removal of Huawei's equipment due to spying fears.

Achievement 

 In 2000, Forbes magazine ranked third among the 50 richest people in China. Personal wealth is estimated at $500 million.
 In 2005, Ren Zhengfei and Zhang Ziyi（章子怡） were included in Time Magazine 's list of the 100 most influential people in the world.
 In 2011, Ren Zhengfei entered the Forbes rich list for the first time with $1.1 billion, ranking 1056th in the world and 92nd in China.
 In 2018, he was named one of the "100 Outstanding Private entrepreneurs in the 40 years of Reform and opening up".
 In April 2021, the Forbes Global Rich List was released, and Ren Zhengfei ranked 2378 on the list with a fortune of 1.3 billion US dollars.

Ren now serves as a deputy chairman of the Board of Directors, but he is not among the current three rotating CEOs. The company had annual revenue of US$92.5 billion in 2017. Ren holds 1.42% of the shares of Huawei, valued at US$450 million in 2010. Huawei is essentially independent of Ren because its shares are held by its employees, but the ownership structure remains opaque.

Quotation 
At the Huawei summing-up meeting in 1992, Ren Zhengfei said only one sentence on the rostrum: "We survived!"
 On October 20, 2000, Ren Zhengfei delivered a speech of "valiant, spirited and striding across the Pacific Ocean"（《雄赳赳，气昂昂，跨过太平洋》） at the farewell meeting of overseas officers and soldiers, pointing out that "an enterprise needs a global strategic vision to be strong; a nation needs to absorb the global essence to prosper; a company needs to build a global business ecosystem to survive." An employee needs to have a cosmopolitan mind and skills to achieve an outstanding career. "
On the evening of December 31, 1991, at a meeting celebrating the successful launch of the BH03 switch, he shouted:If you don't fight, you can't live! Working 40 hours a week can only produce ordinary workers, but it is impossible to produce scientists or engineers, let alone complete industrial upgrading...Twenty years later, the global communications industry is divided into three parts, and Huawei has one!

Family

History
Ren was born on October 25, 1944 in Zhenning County, Guizhou. His grandfather Ren Sanhe was a master chef who was an expert in curing ham from Rendian Village, Pujiang County, Zhejiang. His father, Ren Musheng, courtesy name Moxun, failed to complete university studies when Ren Zhengfei's grandfather died a year prior to his graduation.

During the Japanese occupation, his father migrated south to Guangzhou to work in a  military factory of Nationalist governmentas an accounts clerk. After 1949, his father was appointed as the president of No. 1 Middle School of Duyun where he met Ren Zhengfei's mother Cheng Yuanzhao; his elder brother became a member of the Communist Party in 1958. His mother was a senior teacher at the No. 1 Middle School of Duyun. Ren has five younger sisters and one younger brother.

His family
Ren's first wife was Meng Jun（孟军）, the daughter of Meng Dongbo（孟东波）, a former deputy governor of Sichuan Province. They had two children: daughter Meng Wanzhou（孟晚舟） and son Ren Ping（任平）, both of whom initially took up their mother's surname Meng Ping（孟平）. After their divorce, he married Yao Ling, with whom he had another daughter, Annabel Yao, who is 25 years younger than Meng Wanzhou. As of December 2018, Annabel is a ballet dancer and a computer science student at Harvard University and made a high-profile debut at Le Bal des Débutantes in Paris in 2018. Ren married for the third time to Su Wei（苏薇）, who was reportedly his former secretary.

Despite being Huawei's CEO, Ren is a supporter of Apple and stated that "iPhone has a good ecosystem and when my family are abroad, I still buy them iPhones, so one can't narrowly think love for Huawei should mean loving Huawei phones."

Ren's eldest daughter, Meng Wanzhou, is deputy chairperson and chief financial officer (CFO) of Huawei.

References

Bibliography

External links

1944 births
Living people
Chinese billionaires
Chinese technology company founders
Businesspeople from Guizhou
People from Anshun
Huawei people
20th-century Chinese businesspeople
21st-century Chinese businesspeople
Chongqing University alumni